The Fremont Cut is a canal in 
Seattle, Washington, United States, that connects Lake Union to the east with Salmon Bay to the west.

History
Work first began on the cut when the Lake Washington Improvement Company contracted in 1883 to dig out Ross Creek which at that time was Lake Union’s fresh water outlet to Salmon Bay.  The total amount of material excavated was about 2 million cubic yards. Up until the Chittenden Locks were completed in 1917, the Fremont Cut’s eastern end near the Fremont Bridge was separated from Lake Union by a low wooden dam, a small wooden lock, and a spillway.

Environs
South of the cut is the 456’ high Queen Anne Hill while to the east is the Aurora Bridge (officially the George Washington Memorial Bridge), a cantilever truss, suspension structure that carries old US 99 (Pacific Highway) over the west end of Lake Union. Various high tech companies are located just north of the cut in the Fremont area, notably Adobe Systems, Tableau Software and Google.

References

Buildings and structures in Seattle
Water transport in Seattle
Cut